Jefferson Reis de Jesus, more commonly known as Jefferson is a Brazilian football forward.

Career

Club
On 7 July 2018, Jefferson signed for Armenian Premier League club Alashkert.

FC Džiugas 
In 2021 he signed with the Lithuanian club Džiugas.

On 3 July 2021 he made his debut in A Lyga against FC Hegelmann Litauen. Later, he was injured and not played.

On 30 July he returned to the team and played against Banga and got a yellow card.

FK Banga 
In January 2022 he signed with another Lithuanian club Banga.

References

External links 
 soccerway
 lietuvosfutbolas.lt
 fcdziugas.lt

1995 births
Living people
Brazilian footballers
Armenian Premier League players
Persian Gulf Pro League players
Brazilian expatriate sportspeople in Iran
Expatriate footballers in Armenia
Expatriate footballers in Iran
Brazilian expatriate footballers
Association football forwards
Machine Sazi F.C. players